The Ten Point Programme for Reunification of the Country is a plan written by Kim Il-sung on 6 April 1993, to re-unite North Korea and South Korea.  The program is the stated official policy of North Korea.

The plan's original title was 10-Point Programme of the Great Unity of the Whole Nation for the Reunification of the Country.  It regards the idea of reunification with South Korea under a pan-national unified state, a Federation, leaving the two systems and governments intact while opening the borders.

The program proposes to remove outside influence from the Korean peninsula, especially the US forces based in South Korea, and proposes cooperation on trade and foreign affairs as a reunified country.

The North Korean foreign policy is still dominated by this original document, which has led to better relations with South Korea, beginning with Kim Dae-jung's Sunshine Policy, and in the June 15th North-South Joint Declaration.

See also

Kim Il-sung bibliography
Korean reunification
Korean Division

References
Kim Il Sung: Full text of the 10 Point programme for reunification of the country
: A North Korean webpage, called "By our nation by itself", which promotes national reunification.

Ideology of the Workers' Party of Korea
Politics of North Korea
Works by Kim Il-sung
1993 in North Korea
1993 documents